Eurovision Choir 2023 will be the third Eurovision Choir competition for choral singers, organised by the European Broadcasting Union (EBU) and Interkultur. Latvia will host the event for the second time.

Format
Competing countries who are members of the European Broadcasting Union (EBU) are eligible to participate in Eurovision Choir. Each competing country was represented by a professional choir, and each performed a choral piece lasting no more than six minutes in length. Each piece may include singular or several musical works or of a free genre; but must contain national or regional influence from the participating country.

Participating countries
 the following countries have confirmed their intention to participate in the 2023 contest:

Other countries 

  - On 29 December 2022, Austrian broadcaster Österreichischer Rundfunk (ORF) initally confirmed that they would withdraw from the contest. Although on 16 February 2023 Head of the ORF Cultural Department Martin Traxl said that a decision about a participation has yet to be made.
  - On 1 Januray 2023, BBC Alba annouced that a decision about wether or not they would participate in the contest would be made by the end of January.
  – On 29 December 2022, Swiss broadcaster Radio Télévision Suisse (RTS) confirmed that they would withdraw from the contest.
  - S4C commented on 26 December 2022 that a decision on a potential participation hasn't been made yet.

References

External links 
 

Eurovision Choir
2023 in Latvia